Zhou Yahui (born February 1977) is a Chinese billionaire and entrepreneur. In 2008, he founded  Kunlun Tech Co Ltd (formerly Beijing Kunlun Tech Co Ltd) one of the largest web game developers in China, where he was the chairman and CEO until 2020. Yahui Zhou currently serves as chairman and co-CEO of Opera. His estimated net worth is US$2.2 billion.

Early life 
Zhou was born in February 1977 in Lijiang, China. In 1999 he received a bachelor's degree in mechanical engineering and a master's degree in optical engineering in 2006, both from Tsinghua University in Beijing.

Career 
Zhou's career started in 1999 when he started a website called Vulcan Net funded by Tsinghua University. Vulcan Net was a website dedicated to uploading animations made by people in the local area, especially students in the university. Zhou and Tsinghua University closed Vulcan Net sometime in 2004 due to unprofitability.

Zhou became an executive manager for the social networking service Renren in November 2005. In March 2007, he stopped working for Renren when he became the general manager of Beijing JiNaiTe Technology Co., Ltd. Zhou worked for JiNaiTe Tech as General Manager from March 2007 to March 2008 until he founded his own company, Kunlun Tech Co Ltd. Zhou served as Executive Director and General Manager from March 2008 to March 2011, from 2011 serving as chairman and CEO.

An official name change to Beijing Kunlun Tech Co Ltd was made in March 2011. Zhou is the main owner of the company with 30% of shares. In 2015, Zhou's company went public on the Shenzhen Stock Exchange.

Beijing Kunlun Tech Co Ltd focuses on the distribution and sale of video games in China through their GameArk application. Beijing Kunlun finalized their purchase of a 60% stake in the gay dating app Grindr in January 2016.

The next month, a consortium of investors including Beijing Kunlun acquired Opera Software with Beijing Kunlun acquiring 48%, effectively granting ownership to the company (and Zhou Yahui) by majority. Zhou has served as chairman and CEO of Opera since 2016.

In March 2019, Beijing Kunlun was forced to sell Grindr by the Committee on Foreign Investment in the United States (CFIUS). CFIUS viewed Beijing Kunlun's ownership of Grindr as a national security threat as Grindr has sensitive personal info such as location, messages and even HIV status which could be accessed by engineers in the Kunlun office in Beijing. Grindr was sold a year later in March 2020 to San Vincente Acquisition LLC for $608 million.

On the 13th of April 2020, it was announced that Zhou Yahui would resign as chairman of Beijing Kunlun due to the COVID-19 pandemic. He resigned in order to focus on his e-commerce and payment platform Opay, a fintech company incubated by Opera, based in Africa, primarily used in Nigeria. He was replaced by Wang Liwei.

Personal life 
Zhou was married to Li Qiong, his elementary school classmate. They divorced in September 2016. Li Qiong received $1.1 billion worth in Beijing Kunlun Tech shares, making it one of the most expensive divorce settlements in China.

References 

1977 births
Living people
Chinese billionaires
Businesspeople from Yunnan
People from Lijiang
Chinese technology company founders
Tsinghua University alumni
20th-century Chinese businesspeople
21st-century Chinese businesspeople